Burzaco is a city in Almirante Brown Partido, Buenos Aires Province, Argentina. It has an area of 22.77 km2, holds a population of 98,859. It is 27 kilometres from Buenos Aires city, to which it is linked by the Ferrocarril General Roca South. Although there were some farms in the area since  at least since the end of the 18th century, Burzaco was first established as a town soon after the arrival of the railway in 1865. The current city is the site of the country's first ever National Flag monument, in Burzaco's main square.

External links

 Municipal website
 Burzaco-OnLine

Almirante Brown Partido
Populated places in Buenos Aires Province
Cities in Argentina
Argentina